Never Get Out of These Blues Alive is a studio album by American blues musician John Lee Hooker, released in 1972 by ABC Records and recorded on September 28–29, 1971. The album features Van Morrison, Elvin Bishop, Charlie Musselwhite, and British organist Steve Miller. The album was re-released in 1987 by See For Miles Records with four additional tracks, including two with Hooker's cousin Earl Hooker on slide guitar.

Track listing 
All songs written by Hooker, except noted.

"Bumblebee, Bumblebee" – 4:12
"Hit the Road" – 2:57
"Country Boy – 6:59
"Boogie with the Hook" – 6:32
"T.B. Sheets" (Hooker, Van Morrison) – 4:58
"Letter to My Baby" – 3:57
"Never Get Out of These Blues Alive" – 10:15

Additional tracks on the version by See For Miles Records (1987)

"If You'll Take Care of Me, I'll Take Care of You" – 3:42
"(I Got) A Good 'Un" – 3:26
"Baby I Love You" – 3:15
"Lonesome Mood" – 4:51

Personnel
John Lee Hooker; Guitar, Vocals
Van Morrison; Guitar, Vocals
Earl Hooker; Guitar
Ray MacCarty; Guitar
Luther Tucker; Guitar
Paul Wood; Guitar
Elvin Bishop; Slide guitar
Benny Roweh; Slide guitar
Mel Brown; Guitar, bass guitar
John Kahn; Bass guitar
Gino Skaggs – Bass guitar, drums
Michael White; Violin
Mark Naftalin; Piano
Clifford Coulter; Electric piano
Robert Hooker; Organ, electric piano
Steve Miller; Organ
Charlie Musselwhite; Harmonica
Ron Beck; Drums
Chuck Crimelli; Drums
Ken Swank; Drums
Ed Michel; Production
Baker Bigsby; Mixing
Ken Hopkins; Engineer
Rick Stanley; Assistant Engineer
Philip Melnick; Cover design, photography

Charting history

References

1972 albums
John Lee Hooker albums
ABC Records albums
Albums recorded at Wally Heider Studios